

Leaders of KwaNdebele
(Dates in italics indicate de facto continuation of office)

See also
Bantustan
President of South Africa
State President of South Africa
List of prime ministers of South Africa
Governor-General of the Union of South Africa
Apartheid
List of historical unrecognized states and dependencies

KwaNdebele, Chief Ministers
KwaNdebele, Chief Ministers
KwaNdebele
KwaNdebele